Mangrovibacterium diazotrophicum is a nitrogen-fixing bacterium from the genus of Mangrovibacterium which has been isolated from mangrove sediments.

References

Bacteroidia
Bacteria described in 2014